The chùa Bồ Đề or Bồ Đề pagoda is a Vietnamese Buddhist temple in Hanoi, Vietnam.

References

Buddhist temples in Hanoi